The 1997 UEFA European Under-18 Championship Final Tournament was held in Iceland.

Teams

The following teams qualified for the tournament:

 
 
  (host)

Group stage

Group A

Group B

Third place match

Final

See also
 1997 UEFA European Under-18 Championship qualifying

External links
Results by RSSSF

1997
1997
1996–97 in European football
1997 in Icelandic football
1996–97 in Portuguese football
1996–97 in Hungarian football
1996–97 in French football
1996–97 in Spanish football
1996–97 in Israeli football
1996–97 in Republic of Ireland association football
1996–97 in Swiss football
July 1997 sports events in Europe
1997 in youth association football